The 1940 Philadelphia Eagles season was their eighth in the National Football League. The team failed to improve on their previous output of 1–9–1, losing ten games. The team failed to qualify for the playoffs for the eighth consecutive season.

The Eagles 298 rushing yards in 1940 are the fewest in the history of the NFL. The team gained only 0.94 yards per carry.

Off Season 
After 4 years playing at larger Philadelphia Municipal Stadium the Eagles move to Shibe Park for the 1940 season

Eagles training camp was held at West Chester State Teachers College, West Chester, Pennsylvania.

NFL Draft 
The 1940 NFL Draft was held on December 9, 1939. This year again it was to have 22 rounds, with each team getting 20 picks. The weaker teams only picked in the 2nd and 4th rounds and were passed over in rounds 21 and 22.

The Eagles and Pittsburgh Pirates, before being called Steelers, both finished with 1–9–1, .100 records, but the 1939 Chicago Cardinals ended up at 1–10, .091 and would get the first pick in the draft. The Eagles and Pirates would alternate picking 2nd or 3rd in each round.

Player selections 
The table shows the Eagles selections and what picks they had that were traded away and the team that ended up with that pick. It is possible the Eagles' pick ended up with this team via another team that the Eagles made a trade with.
Not shown are acquired picks that the Eagles traded away.

Schedule

Game recaps 
A recap of the scoring plays and the game scores by quarters during the year. The record after the team's name reflects this games outcome also.

WEEK 1 
Sunday September 15, 1940

WEEK 2 
Sunday September 22, 1940

Scoring

1st Quarter Scoring Plays
 Rams – Johnny Drake 2-yard rush (kick failed) 0 6
 Rams – Johnny Drake unknown yard rush (Pete Gudauskas kick) 0 13

2nd Quarter Scoring Plays
 Eagles – Don Looney 10-yard pass from Davey O'Brien (John Cole kick) 7 13
 Rams – Johnny Drake 8-yard rush (kick failed) 7 19
 
3rd Quarter Scoring Plays
 None

4th Quarter Scoring Plays
 Eagles – Don Looney 23-yard pass from Foster Watkins (kick failed) 13 19
 Rams – Safety, OBrien tackled in end zone 13 21

WEEK 3 
Saturday September 28, 1940

Scoring

1st Quarter Scoring Plays
 Eagles – Joe Bukant 1-yard rush (Fran Murray kick)
 Giants – Ward Cuff 37-yard field goal
 Giants – Ward Cuff 42-yard rush (Ward Cuff kick)

2nd Quarter Scoring Plays
 Giants – Ward Cuff 30-yard field goal

3rd Quarter Scoring Plays
 Giants – Jim Poole 38-yard pass from Eddie Miller (Ward Cuff kick)
 Eagles – Dick Riffle 2-yard rush (Fran Murray kick)

4th Quarter Scoring Plays
NONE

WEEK 4 
Friday, October 4, 1940

Scoring
1st Quarter Scoring Plays
 Eagles – John Cole 45-yard field goal
2nd Quarter Scoring Plays
 Dodgers – Perry Schwartz unknown yard pass from Ace Parker (Ace Parker kick)
 Dodgers Art Jocher 2-yard pass from Dick Cassiano (Ralph Kercheval kick)
 Dodgers Ralph Kercheval 24-yard field goal
3rd Quarter Scoring Plays
 NONE
Eagles Elmer Hackney 1-yard rush (Fran Murray kick)
4th Quarter Scoring Plays
 Eagles Davey O'Brien 10-yard rush (Fran Murray kick)
 Dodgers Pug Manders 1-yard rush (kick failed)
 Dodgers Ace Parker 2-yard rush (Ace Parker kick)

WEEK 5 
Sunday, October 13, 1940

Scoring
1st and 2nd Quarter Scoring Plays
 NONE
3rd Quarter Scoring Plays
 Giants – Eddie Miller 25-yard rush (Ward Cuff kick)
 Giants – Ward Cuff 35-yard field goal
4th Quarter Scoring Plays
 Giants – Lee Shaffer 6-yard pass from Tuffy Leemans (Len Barnum kick)
 Eagles – Frank Emmons 1-yard rush (Foster Watkins kick)

WEEK 6 
Sunday, October 20, 1940

Scoring

1st Quarter Scoring Plays
 Eagles George Somers 46-yard field goal
 Redskins Wayne Millner 41-yard pass from Sammy Baugh (Bob Masterson kick)
2nd Quarter Scoring Plays
 Eagles Dick Riffle 1-yard rush (Fran Murray kick)
 Eagles Don Looney 47-yard pass from Davey O'Brien (Fran Murray kick)
 Redskins Bob Masterson 52-yard pass from Sammy Baugh (Bob Masterson kick)
 Redskins Dick Todd 29-yard pass from Sammy Baugh (Bob Masterson kick)
3rd Quarter Scoring Plays
 Redskins Bob Seymour 5-yard rush (kick failed)
4th Quarter Scoring Plays
 Redskins Dick Todd 2-yard rush (Bob Masterson kick)

WEEK 7 
Saturday, October 26, 1940

Scoring

1st Quarter Scoring Plays
 Dodgers – Banks McFadden 75-yard rush (Ace Parker kick) 7 0
2nd Quarter Scoring Plays
 NONE
3rd Quarter Scoring Plays
 Dodgers – Pug Manders 2-yard rush (Ace Parker kick) 14 0
4th Quarter Scoring Plays
 Eagles – Dick Riffle 4-yard rush (Foster Watkins kick) 14 7
 Dodgers – Bill Leckonby 98-yard kickoff return (Ralph Kercheval kick) 21 7

WEEK 8 
Sunday, November 10, 1940

Scoring

1st Quarter Scoring Plays
 Eagles – George Somers 36-yard field goal 3 0
3rd Quarter Scoring Plays
 Steelers – Coley McDonough 1-yard rush (Armand Niccolai kick)

WEEK 9 
Sunday, November 17, 1940

Scoring

1st Quarter Scoring Plays
 Lions – Lloyd Cardwell 30-yard rush (Chuck Hanneman kick)
3rd Quarter Scoring Plays
 Lions – Whizzer White 7-yard rush (Chuck Hanneman kick)
 Lions – Whizzer White 5-yard rush (Chuck Hanneman kick)

WEEK 10 
Thursday November 28, 1940 – Thanksgiving Day

WEEK 11 
Sunday, December 1, 1940

This was the Eagles 2nd game in 3 days.

 
Scoring
1st Quarter Scoring Plays
 NONE
2nd Quarter Scoring Plays
 Redskins – Wilbur Moore 23-yard rush (kick failed)
3rd Quarter Scoring Plays
 Redskins – Dick Todd 6-yard rush (Bob Masterson kick)
4th Quarter Scoring Plays
 Eagles – Frank Emmons 19-yard pass from Davey O'Brien (kick failed)

Standings

Playoffs 
The Eagles with a 1–10–1 record finished last in the NFL Eastern Division and fail to make it to the 1940 NFL Championship Game. The game was played at Griffith Stadium in Washington, D.C. on December 8, 1940. The Chicago Bears, with an 8–3 record, defeated the Washington Redskins, with a 9–2 record, 73–0, the most one-sided victory in NFL history. The Bears scored on 3 interception returns of Washington passes during the game.
This was the first NFL title game that was broadcast nationwide on radio by Mutual Broadcasting System.

Roster 
(All time List of Philadelphia Eagles players in franchise history)

Postseason 
In the off season Davey O'Brien turned down a salary raise and retired from the NFL.

In December 1940, Pittsburgh Steelers owner Art Rooney sold the Steelers to Alexis Thompson and used half of the proceeds to buy a half interest in the Philadelphia Eagles from his friend Bert Bell. Before the start of the 1941 season Rooney, Bell, and Thompson swapped city and NFL rights for Philadelphia and Pittsburgh. The Pittsburgh Steelers players of 1940 and before thereby became Philadelphia Eagles and the Philadelphia Eagles players of 1940 and before likewise became members of the Pittsburgh Steelers – with the exception of several players who were traded between the two teams.

Award and honors 
 Davey O'Brien leads league with 227 pass attempts
 Davey O'Brien leads league with 124 pass completions
 Davey O'Brien finishes 2nd in league with 1227 passing yards
 Don Looney leads league in passes caught with 58
 Don Looney leads league in passing yards with 707 yards
 Dick Bassi makes Pro All-Star team as a left guard
 Don Looney makes Pro All-Star team as an end

References 

Philadelphia Eagles seasons
Philadelphia Eagles
Philadelphia Eag